Mohit Chattopadhyaya (also spelled Mohit Chattopadhyay) (1 June 1934 – 12 April 2012) was a Bengali Indian playwright, screenwriter, dramatist and poet. He was a leading figure in modern Indian drama. Mohit Chottopadhya died on 12 April 2012. He had been suffering from cancer.

Early life
Mohit Chattopadhyaya was born in the town of Barisal, now in Bangladesh.  He left Bangladesh and immigrated to Calcutta (Kolkata) with his family at the age of thirteen. An avid reader, he started writing as a young boy. In Kolkata, he was a frequent visitor of Chaitanya Library, near his home at Bidon Street. In the library he stumbled upon Six Characters in Search of an Author by Luigi Pirandello, his first contact with an absurd play. He finished his Matriculation examination in 1950 and joined City College, Kolkata. While studying in City College he became close to culturally like-minded people, who became prominent poets, authors, artists in their later lives. He became close friend with Sunil Gongopadhyay, Shibshmbhu Pal, Soumitra Chatterjee, Sandipan Chattopadhyay, Shakti Chattopadhay. He earned his master's degree in Bengali literature as a private candidate from University of Calcutta. His career in academia began as a lecturer at Jangipur College, Murshidabad and later as a Reader of Bengali Literature at City College.

Literary work

Mohit Chattopadhyaya started his literary career as a poet and later shifted to writing plays. He started writing prose poetry along with his friends, and had little interest in rhyming. At first his poetry was published in various magazines and shortly it was published in book format as his anthology of poems.

Subsequently, he stopped writing poems and devoted entirely to writing plays. From the very beginning he avoided writing realistic plays and wrote esoteric often highly political plays. Though he refused to be labelled as an Absurdist playwright, claiming his plays do not conform to the Philosophy of "The Theatre of the Absurd" but frequently he is referred as an exponent of Indian Absurd Drama. The cryptic nature of his plays encouraged critics to call his plays "Kimitibadi" (Kim+Iti) in Bengali, which in English meant, "What is it?”

As a prolific playwright he has written over one hundred plays. Some of his plays have been translated in different languages and have been regularly performed by various theatre groups around India. Other than full-length plays, Mohit Chattopadhyaya has written One Act plays, Verse plays Curtain Raisers, Microplays; he has adapted, edited and translated a number of plays in Bengali from other languages.

His play Raajrakto (Guinea pig) is considered as a milestone in the history of Bengali political drama. Kolkata based theatre group Theatre Workshop under the direction of Bibhash Chokrobarty first performed the play in Kolkata. Later the play was translated into various languages. In Delhi Rajindernath directed the Hindi version. Famous actor Kulbhushan Kharbanda acted in the play. In Mumbai, Satyadeb Dubey directed the play and Amrish Puri acted in it. Amol Palekar acted in the Marathi version and Shymanand Jalan produced another Hindi version of the play. For political reasons the production was banned by The Indian Government.

Film scripts and television scripts

In 1973 Mohit Chattopadhyaya started working on the film script of Chorus in close collaboration with Mrinal Sen. He also wrote the lyrics of the songs used in the film. In the following years he wrote the screenplays of four films by Mrinal Sen, Mrigaya (1976)
Poroshuraam (1980), Oka Uri Katha (1977), Genesis (1986); all the films received numerous awards in national and International film festivals. In 1997 he wrote the screenplay and the lyrics of the film, Damu, which received National Award for best children's film and various other awards.

In 1980 Mohit Chattopadhyaya finished his first and only directorial endeavour, Megher Khela  (The Play of The Clouds), a children's film. He wrote the story and the screenplay. Raja Sen, who would become an accomplished film director later, was the assistant director; Ranajit Ray was the Cinematographer; Debashish Dasgupta was the music director and Mrinmoy Chakrobarty was in charge of editing. The film received critical acclaim. It was shown in various national and international film festivals and got honorary mention at Bucharest Children's Film Festival. Austrian National Television bought the film rights and telecast it in its National Channel.

Mohit Chattopadhyaya started writing scripts for TV serial (TV Series) in the following years. Raja Sen directed almost all his early TV scripts. Subarnolata, Arogyonikatan, Adorsho Hindu Hotel marked one of the most popular and critically acclaimed television serials on Kolkata Doordarshan. He continued writing scripts and worked with other directors in later period.

Other work

Mohit Chattopadhyay has also written numerous essays, articles and papers on theatre, film production, and scriptwriting. One of his most controversial series of essays has been on the relationship between literature and drama. He has taken part in various seminars, talks, workshops and panel discussions on literature and performing arts. He is also the Executive Member of Paschimbanga Natya Academy.

Honors and awards

The recipient of scores of awards and felicitations, Mohit Chattopadhyay received the Sangeet Natak Academy Award in 1991. Among other awards he is the recipient of Girish Award, West Bengal State Award, BFJA Award, Nandikaar Award. He is also conferred with Sangeet Natak Akademi Tagore Ratna, special awards to commemorate 150th birth anniversary of Rabindranath Tagore

Selected bibliography

Plays

Kantha Nalite Surjo	1963
Neel Ranger Ghora	1964
MrityuSambad	        1969
Cheler Dol
Gandho Rajer Hattali	1965
Metamorphosis 		1965
Chondroloke Ognikando	1966
Dwiper Raja 	        1968
Singhasoner Khoyrog	1967
Nishad			1968
Pushpok Rath		1968
Will Shakespeare	1969
BaghBondi		1969
Captain Hurrah 		1970
RaajRakto/ Guniepig 1974
Mrichhokatik    	1990
Mahakalir Baachha	1977
Swadeshi Naksha		1985
Galileo-r Jwibon	1981
Kanamaachi Khela	1983
Bhoot			1983
Aalibaba		1985
Totaraam		1990
Socrates		1989
Nonaajwal		1990
Baman			1987
Sundor			1998
Jochonakumari		1991
Shamibrikha		1990
Takhan Bikel		1992
Lobhendra Gobendra	1990
Guhachitra		1993
Gojanan Charit Manas	1993
Mushthijog		1994
Janmodin		1999
Octopus Limited	1997
Kaal Ba Porshu		1997
Bipanno Bismoy		1998
Swidhidata		1999
Harun Ul Rashid	1999
Tushagni		2000
Jambo			2001
Mr. Right		2003
Kaaler Jatra		2004
Mrs. Soriano		2004
Ghoom/ Ei Ghoom		2003
Ring			1965
Bairer Dwarjaa		1965
Brittyo			1968
Baajpaakhi		1969
Sonaar Chaabi		1973
Laathi			1977
Maachi			1978
Phoenix			1984
Raakhos
Bornobiporjoy
Juto			2003
Dwarpon
Taattoo
kouto
Venice-er Bonik		2004
Daaho 2007
Mayer moto
Hiramon
Naak
Sesh raksha (edited)

Verse plays

Wrikbaidik (1986)
Podoshbdo
Maharaaj
Rangeen Kaach
Dooswapno
Kaaraadondo

Film

Megher Khelaa (direction, Screenplay) 1980 [Awarded in Bucharest Children's Film Festival, Shown in Austria National Television]
Chorus (Co scripted with Mrinal Sen, Lyrics) [1974]
Mrigaya (Co scripted with Mrinal Sen) [1976]
Poroshuraam (Story & Co scripted with Mrinal Sen) [1980]
Oka Uri Katha (Co scripted with Mrinal Sen) [1977]
Genesis (Co scripted with Mrinal Sen) [1986]
Damu (Screenplay & Lyrics) [1997]

Television series (tele-serials)

Subranalata (Screenplay) (1987)
Adarsha Hindu Hotel (Screenplay) (1989)
Arogya Niketan (Screenplay) (1993)
Bankim Sahitye Naari (screenplay) (1989)
Headmaster (Screenplay)
Anjuman (Screenplay) (1996)
Tarashankarer Chhoto Galpo (Screenplay) (1991)
Streeyascharitram (Screenplay)
Jal Pade Pata Nade (Screen Play) (1994)
Hansuli Banker Upokatha (Screen Play)
Chena Achena (Screenplay)

Documentary scripts

Itihasher Kolkata
Suchitra Mitra (1993) [National Award for the best film in the Art and Cultural Section]

Poetry

Ashare Srabon (1956)
Golaaper Birudhe Joodhyo (1961)
Shobadhare Jyotsna (1965)
Onkon Shikhya (1969)
Bhalobasha Bhalobasha (1993)
Kobita Sangroho (1993)

External links
 Review of Harun al-Rashid in The Telegraph
 Mohit Chattopadhyay on Theater & school curriculum
 Mohit Chattopadhyay at Annesha & Co.
 Review of Mr Right in The Hindu

1934 births
Bengali writers
Indian male dramatists and playwrights
Indian male screenwriters
2012 deaths
City College, Kolkata alumni
University of Calcutta alumni
Academic staff of the University of Calcutta
Bengali-language writers
Deaths from cancer in India
Bengali theatre personalities
20th-century Indian dramatists and playwrights
Screenwriters from Kolkata
Dramatists and playwrights from West Bengal
20th-century Indian male writers
Recipients of the Sangeet Natak Akademi Award